William Finnie may refer to:
William Finnie (mayor), 18th-century mayor of Williamsburg, Virginia
William Finnie (MP) (1828–1899), member of the UK parliament
William Finnie (professor), professor of business